Mia Isabella (born July 30, 1985) is a retired American transgender pornographic actress.

Early life
Isabella was born and raised in Chicago, Illinois, but spent most of her childhood in Tennessee before returning to Chicago as a teenager. She is of French, Puerto Rican, and Jamaican descent. Between the ages of 8 and 18, she played the violin at least two hours daily. She graduated from high school at 16 years old, attended the Art Institute of Chicago, and owned a luxury designer boutique. She has a fashion degree from Paris Fashion Institute.

Career
Isabella entered the adult film industry in 2005 at the age of 19 and did her first scene with Yasmin Lee and Kayla Coxxx in T-Girls 3 for Anabolic Video. She took a hiatus from porn when she was 21 years old and returned at age 23. In January 2014, she retired from porn.

Mainstream media appearances
In 2013, Isabella voiced a character known as "Prostitute #1" in the video game Grand Theft Auto V. She was also among the pornographic actresses who appeared in the welcome home party scene for Jax Teller after his release from prison in the Season 7 premiere of Sons of Anarchy, which aired on September 9, 2014.

Personal life
Isabella got married when she was 20 years old and the marriage lasted four years. At age 22, she underwent facial feminization surgery which consisted of chin, jawline, and nasal bone reduction and a mid and upper facelift. She also underwent a second breast augmentation surgery. In September 2010, she had a rhinoplasty, her chin shaved down, cheek implants, another mid and upper facelift, and her right breast corrected, which did not heal properly in her previous surgery.

Awards and nominations

References

External links

 
 
 
 

1985 births
African-American pornographic film actors
American people of French descent
American people of Jamaican descent
American people of Puerto Rican descent
American violinists
Hispanic and Latino American pornographic film actors
American LGBT actors
LGBT Hispanic and Latino American people
LGBT people from Illinois
LGBT people from Tennessee
Living people
Pornographic film actors from Illinois
Pornographic film actors from Tennessee
School of the Art Institute of Chicago alumni
Transgender pornographic film actresses
21st-century violinists
21st-century African-American people
20th-century African-American people